The 1955 George Washington Colonials football team was an American football team that represented George Washington University as part of the Southern Conference during the 1955 college football season. In their fourth season under head coach Bo Sherman, the team compiled a 5–4 record (3–2 in the SoCon).

Schedule

References

George Washington
George Washington Colonials football seasons
George Washington Colonials football